Ringwood Speedway were a British motorcycle speedway team who operated between 1937 and 1993, they were based at Matcham Park Stadium (modern day Ringwood Raceway) off Hurn Road in Ringwood, Hampshire.

History
Open meetings were staged at Matcham Park Stadium during 1930 and 1931 and again from 1946 to 1947. After training in 1950 and more open meetings from 1951 to 1953 a team called the Ringwood Turfs entered league competition for the first time in 1954. Their debut 1954 Southern Area League season ended with a 2nd-place finish.

The following season the team withdrew mid-season and had their results expunged.

Further open meetings and training took place sporadically with a last recorded training and long track meetings in 1993.

Season summary

References

Defunct British speedway teams